The Baltimore Plot was a conspiracy in late February 1861 to assassinate President-elect Abraham Lincoln en route to his inauguration. Allan Pinkerton, founder of the Pinkerton National Detective Agency, played a key role by managing Lincoln's security throughout the journey. Though scholars debate whether or not the threat was real, clearly Lincoln and his advisors believed that there was a threat and took actions to ensure his safe passage through Baltimore, Maryland.

On November 6, 1860, Lincoln was elected as the 16th President of the United States, a Republican, and the first to be elected from that party. Shortly after his election, many representatives from the South made it clear that the Confederacy's secession from the U.S. was inevitable, which greatly increased tension across the nation. A plot to assassinate Lincoln in Baltimore was alleged, and he ultimately arrived secretly in Washington, D.C. on February 23, 1861. A planned train route through Bellaire, Ohio, to Wheeling, Virginia (West Virginia had yet to break off from Virginia) and eastward, was subsequently rerouted up through the Pittsburgh vicinity, through Pennsylvania, into  Maryland and eventually to Washington.

For the remainder of his presidency, Lincoln's many critics would hound him for the seemingly cowardly act of sneaking through Baltimore at night, in disguise, sacrificing his honor for his personal safety. However, the efforts at security may well have been prudent.

Background
Allan Pinkerton was commissioned by the railroad to provide security for the president-elect on his journey to Washington, D.C. Two months after his journey, Baltimore citizens attacked a Union Army regiment from Massachusetts as it marched through the city on its way to Washington. When Virginia seceded and joined the Confederacy, it became necessary for Lincoln to cross Maryland to reach Washington, therefore potentially dangerous for the Republican president-elect to pass through.

The incoming Republican government was not about to take risks, and later that year Lincoln would suspend many civil liberties, even ordering the arrest of Maryland's state legislature for fear it might vote for secession. Pinkerton, in particular, was overly cautious, which he would demonstrate during the coming war, when he repeatedly overestimated Confederate strength and negatively influenced Union Army policy.

Lincoln's actions

On February 11, 1861, President-elect Lincoln boarded an eastbound train in Springfield, Illinois, at the start of a whistle-stop tour of 70 towns and cities, ending with his inauguration in Washington, D.C. Allan Pinkerton had been hired by railroad officials to investigate suspicious activities and acts of destruction of railroad property along Lincoln's route through Baltimore. Pinkerton became convinced that a plot existed to ambush Lincoln's carriage between the Calvert Street Station of the Northern Central Railway and the Camden Station of the Baltimore and Ohio Railroad. This opportunity would present itself during the President-elect's passage through Baltimore on February 23, 1861. Pinkerton tried to persuade Lincoln to cancel his stop at Harrisburg, Pennsylvania, and proceed secretly straight through Baltimore, but Lincoln insisted upon keeping to his schedule.

Pinkerton famously clashed with Lincoln's friend and escort, Ward Hill Lamon, over the President-elect's protection. Lamon offered Lincoln "a Revolver and a Bowie Knife" but Pinkerton protested that he "would not for the world have it said that Mr. Lincoln had to enter the National Capitol armed."

On the evening of February 22, telegraph lines to Baltimore were cut at Pinkerton's behest to prevent communications from passing between potential conspirators in Pennsylvania and Maryland. Meanwhile, Lincoln left Harrisburg on a special train and arrived secretly in Baltimore in the middle of the night. The most dangerous link in the journey was in Baltimore, where a city ordinance prohibited steam engine powered rail travel through the downtown area (due to concerns about noise and fires caused by sparks or cinders). Therefore, the railcars had to be horsedrawn between the President Street and Camden Street stations.

According to Pinkerton, a captain of the roads reported that there was a plot to stab the President-elect. The alleged plan was to have several assassins, armed with knives, interspersed throughout the crowd that would gather to greet Lincoln at the President Street station. When Lincoln emerged from the car, which he had to do to change trains, at least one of the assassins would be able to get close enough to kill him.

Once Lincoln's rail carriage had passed safely through Baltimore, Pinkerton sent a one-line telegram to the president of the Philadelphia, Wilmington and Baltimore Railroad: "Plums delivered nuts safely."

On the afternoon of February 23, Lincoln's scheduled train arrived at Calvert Street Station. in Baltimore. The large crowd that gathered at the station to see the president-elect quickly learned that Lincoln had already passed by. Even though the rest of the Lincoln party, including Mrs. Lincoln and the children, had been on this train as originally scheduled, they had already alighted from the train at an unscheduled stop several blocks north of the President Street station.

People associated with the plot
Harry W. Davies - A Pinkerton agent who is also credited with gathering and supplying information which helped convince Allan Pinkerton that there was a plot to assassinate Lincoln in Baltimore.
Cipriano Ferrandini - A hairdresser from Corsica who emigrated to the United States, and established himself as the long-time barber and hairdresser in the basement of Barnum's Hotel in Baltimore. There, he practiced his trade from the mid-1850s to his retirement long after the close of the American Civil War. He was accused but never indicted for plotting to assassinate Abraham Lincoln on February 23, 1861.
John Gittings - hosted Mary Todd Lincoln in Baltimore.
George Proctor Kane - Baltimore's Marshal of Police who protected Mary Todd Lincoln as she passed through the city. He escorted her to the home of John Gittings.
Ward Hill Lamon - Personal friend of Lincoln who accompanied him through Baltimore.
Hattie Lawton - also known as Hattie H. Lawton, also known as Hattie Lewis, posed as Timothy Webster's wife in Maryland. Lawton was part of Pinkerton's Female Detective Bureau, formed in 1860 to "worm out secrets" by means unavailable to male detectives.
Allan Pinkerton - Head of the Pinkerton Agency
Kate Warne - A Pinkerton agent who is credited with gathering and supplying information which helped convince Allan Pinkerton that there was a plot to assassinate Lincoln in Baltimore; instrumental to Lincoln's safe passage to take the oath of office
Timothy Webster - Joined the secessionist militia, the National Volunteers. Also one of Pinkerton's undercover agents.

Public's perception of Lincoln's actions

Many historians believe that Pinkerton's perception of an assassination plot was incorrect, and Lincoln came to regret that he had slipped through the city unannounced.

Many years after the fact, Ward Hill Lamon would publicly argue that there had been no plot to assassinate the president in 1861. "It is perfectly manifest that there was no conspiracy—no conspiracy of a hundred, of fifty, of twenty, of three; no definite purpose in the heart of even one man to murder Mr. Lincoln in Baltimore."

In the 1891 book Recollections of President Lincoln and his Administration, author L.E. Chittenden argues that there was no need for any precautions, such as a disguise, because Lincoln "entered the sleeping–car at Philadelphia, and slept until awakened within a few miles of Washington." That account contradicts other firsthand accounts, which state that Lincoln spent a sleepless and anxious night with Lamon and Pinkerton, during which he "spoke in a quiet voice to avoid being noticed."

Whether or not the president-elect was ever in any real danger of being assassinated, Lincoln's efforts to reach Washington, D.C., safely instantly became a humiliating cause célèbre across the nation, much to his chagrin. Several elements of the initial February 23, 1861 article in The New York Times were especially damning. Primarily, the fact that such a negative report came from an ardently Republican newspaper gave it instant credibility, much more than it would have enjoyed if it had come from a Copperhead or Southern source. When The New York Times published Joseph Howard, Jr.'s account of the President-elect disguised in a scotch-cap and long cloak, the nation "rocked with laughter, bringing abuse and ridicule down on Lincoln."

Substantively, the Howard article was a direct assault on Lincoln's masculinity. The article states that Lincoln was reluctant and too scared and to go but compelled to go by Colonel Sumner's indignation and by the insistence and shame of his wife and several others.

The newspapers lampooned Lincoln for slipping through Baltimore in the dead of night. Adalbert J. Volck, a Baltimore dentist and caricaturist, was inspired to pen his famous satirical etching "Passage through Baltimore". Volck's image of a startled Lincoln in his nightshirt peering out of the side of his rail car as it passes through Baltimore has become part of the Lincoln iconography. "In the nineteenth century, when pictures were less common and more prized, the scotch-cap symbol remained a prop in Confederate graphics, and some Northern-made prints as well, for years—the reminder of Lincoln fleeing in disguise an automatic accusation of his supposed lack of character."

For the rest of his presidency, the story of his sneaking like a coward through Baltimore would be told and retold by his enemies, with particular effect by cartoonists of the day. He was drawn with many variations of Scottish headwear, which eventually morphed into a Scottish balmoral cap and very short kilt. The absurd disguise was often accompanied by a terrified expression on the President-elect's face, to further undermine the public's image of his courage and masculinity. Images such as a comic strip in Harper's Weekly plagued Lincoln throughout his presidency.

Newspapers of all parties mocked Lincoln's actions. In a Vanity Fair cartoon, the kilt was traded for a dress the president had borrowed from his wife. By the time that Lincoln arrived in Washington, he was the laughing stock of the entire country.

The New York Tribune was nonetheless forced to admit, "It is the only instance recorded in our history in which the recognized head of a nation ... has been compelled, for fear of his life, to enter the capital in disguise." More blunt was the denunciation by the Baltimore Sun:

Had we any respect for Mr. Lincoln, official or personal, as a man, or as President-elect of the United States ... the final escapade by which he reached the capital would have utterly demolished it ... He might have entered Willard's Hotel with a "head spring" and a "summersault," and the clown's merry greeting to Gen. Scott, "Here we are!" and we should care nothing about it, personally. We do not believe the Presidency can ever be more degraded by any of his successors than it has by him, even before his inauguration.

In popular culture
In 1951, Metro-Goldwyn-Mayer (MGM) released a fictional re-creation of the alleged plot against Lincoln, The Tall Target. Its story generally follows what is known about the Baltimore Plot, with some differences. It is a New York Police Department detective named John Kennedy, played by Dick Powell, who contacts the administration about the conspiracy and boards the train hoping to discover whether any of the plotters are on board before they reach Baltimore.

There actually was an NYPD officer, John Alexander Kennedy, who claimed to have been the one who uncovered the Baltimore Plot, but unlike Powell's movie character, he was not actually on the scene. Moreover, in real life, Kennedy was the superintendent of the entire force. In the film, he is simply a detective sergeant.

"The Death Trap," an episode of the 1966–1967 television series The Time Tunnel, includes the 1861 Baltimore plot, but it also depicts a brief difficulty with the time machine that caused the showing of an enactment of the April 14, 1865 shooting of Lincoln at Ford's Theatre in Washington. The episode depicts a bomb being used in the 1861 Baltimore plot and has the attempt being plotted by Abolitionists, who hope to plunge the nation into a war in which slavery will be ended; the plotters are apparent sympathizers with John Brown, who had already been hanged. In reality, the American Civil War actually began in April 1861, with the attack on Fort Sumter.

The popular YouTube series "Puppet History" has an episode which describes a simplified version of the Baltimore Plot. The episode mainly focuses on Kate Warne, and how she aided in saving the life of the president elect. There is also a graphic novel focusing on Kate Warne and the Pinkerton's role penned by Jeff Jensen.

See also
American Civil War spies
Assassination of Abraham Lincoln
Charles Van Wyck
List of United States presidential assassination attempts and plots

References

Notes

Bibliography
Cuthbert, Norma Barrett (ed.). Lincoln and the Baltimore Plot, 1861. (1949)
Evitts, William J., A Matter of Allegiances- Maryland from 1850-1861(Baltimore: Johns Hopkins University Press,1974)
Flight of Abraham. Woodcut engraving from Harper's Weekly, New York, March 9, 1861.
Harper, Robert S., Lincoln and the Press. (McGraw-Hill Book Company, Inc. New York, 1951.)
Harris, William C. Lincoln's Rise to the Presidency.  (University Press of Kansas, 2000.)
Holzer, Harold, "Lincoln Seen & Heard." (University Press of Kansas, 2000.)
Kline, Michael J.  The Baltimore Plot: The First Conspiracy to Assassinate Abraham Lincoln (Westholme Publishing Lte., Yardley, Pa., 2008)
Lamon, W: Life of Abraham Lincoln, page 513. (James R. Osgood and Company, 1872.)
Pinkerton, A. (1883). The Spy of the Rebellion; being a true history of the spy system of the United States Army during the late rebellion. Revealing many secrets of the war hitherto not made public. Comp. from official reports prepared for President Lincoln, General McClellan and the provost-marshal-general. New York, G.W. Carleton & Co. (1883)
 J Hist Dent. 2001 Mar;49(1):17-23. (2001)
Internet Movie Database

 
1861 crimes in the United States
American Civil War, Origins of the
Pinkerton (detective agency)
1861 in Maryland
Assassination of Abraham Lincoln
Attempted assassinations of presidents of the United States
February 1861 events